Breda is a genus of jumping spiders that was first described by George Peckham & Elizabeth Peckham in 1894.

Species
 it contains thirteen species, found in South America, Panama, Mexico, and on Trinidad:
Breda akypueruna Ruiz & Brescovit, 2013 – Brazil
Breda apicalis Simon, 1901 – Ecuador, Brazil, Paraguay, Argentina
Breda bicruciata (Mello-Leitão, 1943) – Brazil, Uruguay, Argentina
Breda bistriata (C. L. Koch, 1846) – Brazil, Argentina
Breda lubomirskii (Taczanowski, 1878) – Colombia, Ecuador, Peru, Brazil
Breda milvina (C. L. Koch, 1846) (type) – Mexico, Panama, Trinidad, Brazil, Bolivia
Breda modesta (Taczanowski, 1878) – Peru, Brazil, Guyana, Paraguay, Argentina
Breda nanica Ruiz & Brescovit, 2013 – Brazil
Breda notata Chickering, 1946 – Panama
Breda oserictops (Mello-Leitão, 1941) – Argentina
Breda paraensis Ruiz & Brescovit, 2013 – Brazil
Breda tristis Mello-Leitão, 1944 – Brazil, Uruguay, Argentina
Breda variolosa Simon, 1901 – Brazil

References

Salticidae genera
Salticidae
Spiders of Central America
Spiders of Mexico
Spiders of South America